In stellar astronomy, the Algol paradox  is a paradoxical situation when elements of a binary star seem to evolve in discord with the established theories of stellar evolution.  A fundamental feature of these theories is that the rate of evolution of stars depends on their mass:  The greater the mass, the faster this evolution, and the more quickly it leaves the main sequence, entering either a subgiant or giant phase.

In the case of Algol and other binary stars, something completely different is observed: The less massive star is already a subgiant, while the star with much greater mass is still on the main sequence. Since the partner stars of the binary are thought to have formed at approximately the same time and so should have similar ages, this appears paradoxical. The more massive star, rather than the less massive one, should have left the main sequence.

The paradox is resolved by the fact that in many binary stars, there can be a flow of material between the two, disturbing the normal process of stellar evolution. As the flow progresses, their evolutionary stage advances, even as the relative masses change. Eventually, the originally more massive star reaches the next stage in its evolution despite having lost much of its mass to its companion.

See also 
 Algol variable

References

Paradoxes
Stellar astronomy